Najee Jerome Harris (born March 9, 1998) is an American football running back for the Pittsburgh Steelers of the National Football League (NFL). He played college football at Alabama and was selected by the Steelers in the first round of the 2021 NFL Draft.

Early life
Harris is from the San Francisco Bay Area. One of five children of a single mother, he grew up in several troubled neighborhoods, including time in a homeless shelter when he was in middle school before the family moved to Antioch.

High school career
Harris played his high school football career at Antioch High School in Antioch, California. As a sophomore in 2014, Harris rushed for 2,263 yards with 23 touchdowns. As a junior he had 2,744 rushing yards and 36 touchdowns. As a senior, he had 2,776 rushing yards and 34 touchdowns.

Recruiting
Harris was considered the #1 recruit in the class of 2017, by Scout and Rivals. 247Sports rated him as the No. 2 overall recruit behind Jaelan Phillips while ESPN ranked him the No. 11 overall recruit. Harris received offers from multiple top football programs including the Alabama Crimson Tide, Michigan Wolverines, Ohio State Buckeyes, USC Trojans, and Notre Dame Fighting Irish. He committed to the Alabama Crimson Tide in 2015. Harris was one of the most hyped running back recruits since Bryce Brown in 2009 and Leonard Fournette in 2014. Multiple recruiting experts compared him to Adrian Peterson.

College career
Harris played for the University of Alabama from 2017–2020 under head coach Nick Saban.

2017 season

As a freshman, Harris played in all 14 games but had limited carries as players like Damien Harris, Bo Scarbrough, and Josh Jacobs handled the main workload. Harris finished the season with 370 yards on 61 carries averaging 6.1 yards per carry. He scored three rushing touchdowns on the season. In the National Championship against Georgia, Harris had six carries for 64 rushing yards in the 26–23 victory.

2018 season

In his sophomore season, Harris was third running back behind Damien Harris and Josh Jacobs. Harris started the season with a rushing touchdown in four of the first five games but did not find the endzone the rest of the season. Harris had his best game against Arkansas State, carrying the ball 13 times and gaining a career-high 135 yards. Harris played in 15 games, recording 783 yards on 117 carries and scoring four rushing touchdowns.

2019 season

With Damien Harris and Josh Jacobs off to the NFL, Harris became the starting running back for Alabama Crimson Tide. He and Brian Robinson Jr. largely dominated the backfield production for the Crimson Tide. On September 14, Harris had two receiving touchdowns in the 47–23 victory over South Carolina. On October 19, against Tennessee in the Third Saturday in October, he had 21 carries for 105 rushing yards and two rushing touchdowns in the 35–13 victory. On November 9, against LSU, he had 19 carries for 146 rushing yards, one rushing touchdown, and one receiving touchdown in the 46–41 loss. In the following game at Mississippi State, Harris had four total touchdowns in the 38–7 victory. In the Iron Bowl against Auburn, Harris had 27 carries for 146 rushing yards and one rushing touchdown in the 48–45 loss. Alabama finished with a 10–2 record and qualified for the Citrus Bowl. In the Citrus Bowl, Harris had 24 carries for 136 rushing yards and two rushing touchdowns in the 35–16 victory over Michigan. In the 2019 season, Harris had 209 carries for 1,224 rushing yards and 13 rushing touchdowns while catching 27 passes for 304 receiving yards and seven receiving touchdowns. Despite speculation that he would declare for the 2020 NFL Draft, Harris announced that he would return to Alabama for his senior year.

2020 season

Due to the COVID-19 pandemic in the United States, Alabama's season was cut to an all-conference, ten-game season beginning on September 26. In 2020, Harris was the starting running back for the Alabama Crimson Tide. He and Robinson continued to have a large majority of the backfield carries. In the regular season opener against the Missouri Tigers, Harris had 17 attempts for 98 rushing yards and three rushing touchdowns in the 38–19 victory. His best game of the season was against Ole Miss, where he attempted 23 rushes for 206 rushing yards with five rushing touchdowns in the 63–48 victory. Against the Georgia Bulldogs he ran for 31 attempts with 152 rushing yards, one rushing touchdown and 4.9 yards on average in the 41–24 victory. In the following game against Tennessee, he had 157 scrimmage yards and three rushing touchdowns in the 48–17 victory. On December 5, against LSU, he had 21 carries for 145 rushing yards and two rushing touchdowns in the 55–17 victory. In the SEC Championship, he had 245 scrimmage yards (178 rushing, 67 receiving) and five total touchdowns in the 52–46 victory. He finished fifth in Heisman Trophy voting. Alabama went 11–0 and qualified for the College Football Playoff as the #1 seed. In the Semifinals, the Rose Bowl against Notre Dame, Harris had 15 carries for 125 rushing yards in the 31–14 victory. In the National Championship, Harris had 158 scrimmage yards and three total touchdowns in the 52–24 victory over Ohio State to earn his second National Championship. Harris finished his career as the all-time leader in rushing yards (3,843), total scrimmage yards (4,624) and touchdowns (57) for the Crimson Tide. He was a Consensus All-American and won the Doak Walker Award.

Statistics

College statistics

Professional career 

Harris was selected in the first round with the 24th overall in the 2021 NFL Draft by the Pittsburgh Steelers. He was the first running back selected. On May 25, 2021, Harris signed his rookie contract with the Steelers, worth $13.1 million including a $6.9 million signing bonus over four years.

2021 season

In Week 3 against the Cincinnati Bengals, Harris recorded 142 all purpose yards, including 14 catches in 19 targets. This tied the NFL record for most catches in a game for a rookie running back, and were the second-highest amount of targets for a running back since 1992 (when the data was first tracked). In Week 5 against the Denver Broncos, Harris recorded 122 yards on 23 carries and a rushing touchdown in the 27–19 win.  It marked his first game rushing over 100 yards. He became the first Steelers' rookie to score a rushing touchdown and record 100 yards rushing on his first five games, since Franco Harris in 1972. In Week 17, Harris ran for a career-high 188 yards and the game-sealing touchdown in a 26–14 win over the Cleveland Browns.

Harris finished his rookie season with 1,200 rushing yards and seven touchdowns, and 74 catches for 467 yards and three touchdowns. He finished fourth in rushing yards, fourth in all-purpose yards, and led all running backs in receptions. His 381 touches led the NFL and had zero fumbles. He was selected as an alternate for the 2022 Pro Bowl, replacing Bengals running back Joe Mixon. He was named to the NFL All-Rookie Team.

2022 season

Harris got off to a slow start in 2022. Through the first eight games of the season, he only managed to eclipse 50 rushing yards three times and scored three total touchdowns. Following the team's bye week, he would go on to rush for more than 50 yards in seven of the last nine games and score seven total touchdowns. His best game of the season came in a Week 17 matchup against the Baltimore Ravens. Harris rushed for a season high 111 yards and caught the game winning touchdown from rookie quarterback Kenny Pickett with less than a minute to play. 

He finished the 2022 season with 272 carries for 1,038 yards, seven rushing touchdowns, and 41 receptions for 229 yards and three receiving touchdowns. This made Harris the first Steelers player to rush for 1,000 yards in their 1st two seasons

NFL career statistics

Regular season

Postseason

Personal life 
Harris graduated from the University of Alabama with a degree in Consumer Services in 2020. During his last college football season, Harris began celebrating touchdowns by striking the iconic World Cup pose of Megan Rapinoe. He mentioned finding Rapinoe's views on feminism and standing for her beliefs as "motivating" and "inspirational".

In January 2019, Harris signed with Beast Mode Marketing, the marketing agency of former NFL running back Marshawn Lynch.

On the day of the 2021 NFL Draft, Harris declined the invitation to the event in Cleveland, Ohio, opting instead to host a party for the kids served at Greater Richmond Interfaith Program, the homeless shelter he spent his childhood at. He later gathered with family and friends to watch the draft at a restaurant owned by Marshawn Lynch, in Emeryville, California.

In 2021, Harris founded the nonprofit organization Da' Bigger Picture Foundation, which provides assistance to families impacted by homelessness and hunger.

References

External links
 
Alabama Crimson Tide bio
Pittsburgh Steelers bio

1998 births
Living people
People from Antioch, California
Players of American football from California
Sportspeople from the San Francisco Bay Area
American football running backs
Alabama Crimson Tide football players
All-American college football players
Pittsburgh Steelers players